Gorran High Lanes, known locally as Gorran Highlanes, is a hamlet in the parish of St Goran in mid Cornwall, England.

References

Hamlets in Cornwall